Jon David Wilkin (born 1 November 1983), also known by the nicknames of "Wilko" or "Jean Jean", is an English former professional rugby league footballer who last played as a  and  for St Helens in the Super League, the Toronto Wolfpack in the Betfred Championship and Betfred Super League and Hull Kingston Rovers in the Northern Ford Premiership. He played for England and Great Britain at international level.

Background
Wilkin was born in Kingston upon Hull, East Yorkshire, England.

Club career

Hull Kingston Rovers
Wilkin started his career at Hull Kingston Rovers . He made his debut for the club in 2002 which was also his only season at his boyhood club as he signed for Super League club St. Helens for Super League VIII in 2003.

St Helens
Wilkin soon broke into the first team and has been dubbed by some as one of the most promising running backs in the game. By the age of 24, Wilkin had impressed many and played in some high octane matches. 

However, the 2006 season was a new high point in Jon's career. He was a key member of the treble-winning team as Saints won the 2006 Challenge Cup where he played with a broken nose.

The icing on the cake for Wilkin and St Helens came when they won the BBC TV Sports Personality of the Year Team of the Year award, with Daniel Anderson taking the Best Coach honour. Wilkin (L) was recognised for his good season by being named in the 2006 Super League Dream Team. 

As 2006 Super League champions, St Helens faced 2006 NRL Premiers the Brisbane Broncos in the 2007 World Club Challenge.

Jon was awarded community volunteer of 2008 at a ceremony in Manchester. Jon said of his achievement "All those hours of helping others is part of my job". Jon went on to thank, amongst others, author Rudyard Kipling whose poem 'If' is a prominent influence in his life.

He played in 2008's Super League XIII Grand Final defeat by Leeds. 

He played in the 2009 Super League Grand Final defeat by the Leeds Rhinos at Old Trafford.

He played in the 2011 Super League Grand Final defeat by the Leeds Rhinos at Old Trafford.

Toronto Wolfpack
Wilkin ended his long association with St Helens and signed for the Toronto Wolfpack ahead of the 2019 season.

In July 2020 Wilkin announced that he would retire at the end of the 2020 season.

International career

Wilkin was called in to the Tri Nations squad in 2005 but did not feature in the competition.

He was included in the 25-man squad for the 2006 Tri-Nations Tour of Australia and New Zealand. Wilkin made his international début from the bench at the Aussie Stadium, Sydney on 4 November 2006 against Australia. He came off the bench in two further games in that series, the first against New Zealand in Wellington, and the second against Australia in Brisbane.

Wilkin was selected for the England squad to compete in the 2008 Rugby League World Cup tournament in Australia. 

Group A's first match against Papua New Guinea he played from the interchange bench in England's victory.

Personal life
Wilkin won The Observer's first Community Champion Award.

In January 2012, it was announced that Wilkin was to be the first chairman of the newly founded Players' Association; League 13.

In 2015 Wilkin opened an independent coffee shop in partnership with former St Helens team mate Mark Flanagan in Manchester city centre.

In 2013 Wilkin married his first wife Megan though they subsequently divorced. In 2018, Wilkin married British Olympian Fran Halsall

References

External links

Toronto Wolfpack profile
St Helens profile
Statistics at rugby-league.com
Profile at saints.org.uk
Saints' Wilkin gets two-match ban

1983 births
Living people
BBC sports presenters and reporters
England national rugby league team captains
England national rugby league team players
English rugby league players
Great Britain national rugby league team players
Hull Kingston Rovers players
English rugby league commentators
Rugby league five-eighths
Rugby league locks
Rugby league second-rows
Rugby league players from Kingston upon Hull
St Helens R.F.C. captains
St Helens R.F.C. players
Toronto Wolfpack players